This is a list of articles that have something substantive to do with the county of Bács-Kiskun.

See also
 List of cities, towns, and villages in Bács-Kiskun county
 List of people from Bács-Kiskun
 List of Soltvadkert Mayors

0-9

A

B
 Baja
 Bácsalmás
 Bács-Bodrog
 József Bayer

C

D
 Dunavecse
 Danube
 Danube-Kris-Mures-Tisza

E
 Jenő Ernst

F

G
 András Gáspár
 Great Hungarian Plain

H

I
 Izsák

J
 Jánoshalma

K
 Kecel
 Kecskemét
 Kerekegyháza
 Kiskunság National Park
 Kiskunfélegyháza
 Kiskunhalas
 Kalocsa
 Kiskőrös
 Kiskunmajsa
 Kunszentmiklós

L
 Lajosmizse
 Lake Szelid
 Lake Vadkert

M
 Béla Magyari
 Lázár Mészáros
 Dezső Miskolczy
 Ferenc Móra

N

O

P
 Pest-Pilis-Solt-Kiskun
 Sándor Petőfi
 Puszta

Q

R

S
 Solt
 Soltvadkert
 Szabadszállás

T
 Tisza
 Tiszakécske
 Tompa

U

V

W

X

Y

Z

Bács-Kiskun County
Hungary-related lists